KMAL (1470 AM, "ESPN 1220/1470") is a radio station licensed to serve Malden, Missouri, United States.  The station is owned by Max Media and licensed to MRR License LLC. It airs a sports format in conjunction with KGIR and  featuring programming from ESPN Radio.

The station was assigned the KMAL call letters by the Federal Communications Commission on September 17, 1999.

Ownership
In December 2003, Mississippi River Radio, acting as Max Media LLC (John Trinder, president/COO), reached an agreement to purchase WCIL, WCIL-FM, WJPF, WOOZ-FM, WUEZ, WXLT, KCGQ-FM, KEZS-FM, KGIR, KGKS, KJEZ, KKLR-FM, KLSC, KMAL, KSIM, KWOC, and KZIM from the Zimmer Radio Group (James L. Zimmer, owner). The reported value of this 17 station transaction was $43 million.

Previous Logo
 (KMAL's logo under previous simulcast with KLSC 92.9 FM)

References

External links

MAL
ESPN Radio stations
Dunklin County, Missouri
Radio stations established in 1954
Max Media radio stations
1999 establishments in Missouri
MAL